The Marentis House, at 45 Monterey St. in San Juan Bautista, California, was built in 1873. It was listed on the National Register of Historic Places in 1984.

It was designed in Gothic Revival style by George Chalmers, a local builder/architect who was from New England and was believed to have been influenced by Alexander Jackson Davis, an architect who authored/illustrated pattern books.  The house was built by Thomas W. Bermingham, another local builder.

It has twin gables facing to the front, from a steeply pitched roof, which was shingled with redwood shingles. Two upper front windows have Eastlake window hoods and much of the original glass remains in its windows. The house's floors and ceilings are made of redwood tongue-and-groove boards. 

It received limited earthquake retrofitting in the 1990s along with a mahogany gothic library and rebuilt fireplaces and chimney. The original front door has been replaced with a gothic style dutch door.

See also
Benjamin Wilcox House, also designed and/or built by George Chalmers, in San Juan Bautista, and NRHP-listed

References

National Register of Historic Places in San Benito County, California
Gothic Revival architecture in California
Houses completed in 1873